Phyllomedusa distincta is a species of frog in the subfamily Phyllomedusinae, endemic to Brazil.
Its natural habitats are subtropical or tropical moist lowland forests and freshwater marshes. It is threatened by habitat loss.

References

External links

Phyllomedusa
Endemic fauna of Brazil
Amphibians described in 1950
Taxonomy articles created by Polbot